The 1973–74 Segunda División season saw 20 teams participate in the second flight Spanish league. Real Betis, Hércules CF and UD Salamanca were promoted to Primera División. CA Osasuna, Deportivo de La Coruña, Levante UD and Linares were relegated to Tercera División.

Teams

Final table

Results

Relegation playoff

Pichichi Trophy

External links 
  Official LFP Site

Segunda División seasons
2
Spain